Button wood is a common name for several plants and may refer to:

Glochidion ferdinandi, native to eastern Australia
Platanus occidentalis, native to North America
Conocarpus erectus, native to tropical and subtropical regions around the world